Dante Leon may refer to:

 Dante Leon (martial artist) (born 1995), Canadian grappler and Brazilian jiu-jitsu black belt competitor
 Dante Leon (wrestler), a ring name of American professional wrestler Marcos Meza (born 1994)